Tello Mobile is a Mobile Virtual Network Operator (MVNO) that uses the T-Mobile network to provide talk, text, and data to its customers. Tello originally used the Sprint network, but transitioned to the T-Mobile network after the T-Mobile and Sprint merger. The company was founded in 2016 and headquarters are located in Sandy Springs, Georgia.

Tello is a prepaid cell phone service (MVNO) that in 2022 operates on the T-Mobile network and the Sprint network.

Products and history 
The company was founded in 2016. The headquarters is located in Atlanta, Georgia.

Tello Mobile gives options to choose the number of minutes, text messages, or data that can be used. Alternatively, they can choose a pay-as-you-go/prepaid mobile plan. Tello's highest priced plan is the Unlimited Data plan.

On January 7, 2020, Tello announced the launch of its unlimited phone plan.  On February 12, 2020, the company added family plans to its variety of phone plans offering its customers the possibility to add extra lines at no added cost. There can be an unlimited number of additional lines, each with their own phone number and Tello plan.

Products are developed based on a no-contract policy, and are available exclusively online. Users pay for their service based on their usage of data, and no separate tethering fees are charged by Tello to share a connection with laptops or other Wi-Fi capable devices.

Tello Mobile has supported devices that run on Sprint (CDMA), but migrated existing subscribers to the T-Mobile (GSM) network. CDMA connectivity via the Sprint network remained until the end of 2021. After that time subscribers are required to have a GSM VoLTE/HD Voice device to use Tello. Tello allows devices to be purchased directly from the company, or for existing "unlocked" GSM phones to be switched over to their service. The company provides a compatibility checker to help customers determine if their device is compatible.

On January 18, 2021, Tello began enrolling customers with GSM VoLTE/HD Voice-compatible phones, incompatible with the Sprint CDMA network. A GSM VoLTE/HD Voice device is now required for new customers on Tello.

See also 
 List of United States mobile virtual network operators

References

External links 
 Official website 

Companies based in Atlanta
Mobile phone companies of the United States
Telecommunications companies established in 2016